Renate Lasker-Harpprecht (14 January 1924 – 3 January 2021) was a German author and journalist. She survived the Holocaust, having been imprisoned at Auschwitz and Bergen-Belsen.

Biography
Lasker-Harpprecht was arrested on 5 June 1943 along with her sister, Anita, who was a member of the Women's Orchestra in Auschwitz. The two sisters survived and were interviewed by Patrick Gordon Walker on 15 April 1945 at Bergen-Belsen, which was one of the first interviews of a Holocaust survivor. The recording was lost but later found by Bayerischer Rundfunk in the German Broadcasting Archive.

After she gained her freedom, Lasker-Harpprecht became an interpreter for the British Army for the remainder of World War II. She later worked in London for the BBC, as well as Westdeutscher Rundfunk in Cologne and ZDF in the United States. In 1982, she moved to France where she spent the remainder of her life alongside her husband,  until his death in September 2016. In 2016, she received the Preis für Verständigung und Toleranz, awarded by the Jewish Museum Berlin. She died in La Croix-Valmer on 3 January 2021 at the age of 96.

Publications
 Familienspiele (1972)
 Es war der Tag, an dem das Leben noch einmal begann (2002)

References

1924 births
2021 deaths
Holocaust survivors
Auschwitz concentration camp survivors
Bergen-Belsen concentration camp survivors
German women writers
German journalists
BBC people
Westdeutscher Rundfunk people
ZDF people
Writers from Wrocław
Silesian Jews
German women journalists
Jewish women writers
Jewish journalists
German expatriates in the United Kingdom
German expatriates in the United States